Dr. Kay Martin is a former superintendent of the Francis Tuttle Technology Center.

Martin was appointed to the post in 1997.  Martin was inducted to the Oklahoma Women's Hall of Fame in 2007.

Martin was named interim director of the Oklahoma Department of Career and Technology Education from Feb. to April 2013.

Martin was inducted into the Oklahoma CareerTech Hall of Fame in the Class of 2013.

References

External links
Oklahoma Women's Hall of Fame

Year of birth missing (living people)
Living people